Elections to Trafford Council were held on 2 May 1991.  One-third of the council was up for election, with each successful candidate to serve a four-year term of office, expiring in 1995. The Conservative party retained overall control of the council.

After the election, the composition of the council was as follows:

Summary

References

1991 English local elections
1991
1990s in Greater Manchester